Hypericum reflexum is a species of plant in the St. Johns wort family, Hypericaceae, endemic to the Canary Islands. The flowerheads produce 5–40 bright yellow flowers with five petals each.

Hypericum reflexum was described in 1782 by Carl Linnaeus the Younger.

References

reflexum
Plants described in 1782
Endemic flora of the Canary Islands